International Institute of Business and Technology (IIBT) is an Australian government approved Higher Education (HE) and Vocational Education Trainer (VET) provider of pre-university, first-year university and English programs. The school has one campus in Ho Chi Minh City.

Other overseas campuses are located in Sri Lanka, China, Indonesia and in Perth, Australia.

University Direct Entry Program
Besides providing General English courses, IIBT is known for offering courses to students from China, Vietnam and Indonesia that enable them to get direct entry into top universities in Australia.

Partner Universities
IIBT has a unique pathway that grants students entrance into 2nd-year in an Australian university.
 Central Queensland University
 Swinburne University of Technology
 Curtin University
 Edith Cowan University
 University of Wollongong
 Bond University
 University of Tasmania

See also
IIBT Vietnam
IIBT Australia
 IDP Education
 British Council

References

Australia–Vietnam relations
International schools in Ho Chi Minh City